Steven Raymond Foucault (born October 3, 1949) is a retired Major League Baseball pitcher from 1973 to 1978 for the Texas Rangers, Detroit Tigers, and Kansas City Royals. Foucault attended Miami Coral Park Senior High and South Georgia College He was traded from the Rangers to the Tigers for Willie Horton on April 12, 1977.

For his career, he compiled a 35-36 record, with a 3.21 ERA, 307 strikeouts and 52 saves in 277 appearances.  In 2007 Foucault was hired as pitching coach for the Newark Bears of the independent Atlantic League, helping lead the team to the 2007 Atlantic League championship. In 2009-10 He was the pitching coach for the Evansville Otters. Currently he is the pitching coach for the Long Island Ducks.

For a period of time in the 1980s he was a police officer in Arlington, Texas.

Steven Foucault's parents are Betty J Foucault and Raymond Foucault.

References

External links

Living people
1949 births
Texas Rangers players
Detroit Tigers players
Kansas City Royals players
Major League Baseball pitchers
Baseball players from Minnesota
Wytheville Senators players
Anderson Senators players
Pittsfield Senators players
Burlington Senators players
Burlington Rangers players
Denver Bears players
Charleston Charlies players
South Georgia Tigers baseball players